Thaís Regina da Silva (born 27 March 1999), known as Thaís Regina or just Thaís, is a Brazilian professional footballer who plays as a central defender for Flamengo and the Brazil women's national team.

Club career
Thaís was born in Recife, Pernambuco, and made her senior debut with hometown side Sport Recife in 2014. She subsequently played for  Vitória das Tabocas and Coríntians before signing for Iranduba on 30 December 2016.

Ahead of the 2019 season, she joined São Paulo, where she became a defensive mainstay and renewed her contract for the 2020 and 2021 seasons.

On 23 December 2022, Thais moved to Flamengo.

International career
After representing Brazil at under-17 and under-20 sides, Thaís received her first call-up for the full side in February 2022.

Personal life
Thaís had a relationship with fellow footballer Rwan Seco. A forward, he plays for Santos.

References

1999 births
Living people
Sportspeople from Recife
Brazilian women's footballers
Women's association football defenders
Campeonato Brasileiro de Futebol Feminino Série A1 players
São Paulo FC (women) players
Clube de Regatas do Flamengo (women) players
Brazil women's international footballers